Scott Hogsett (born 1972) is an American Paralympic wheelchair rugby player from Spokane, Washington who was a world championship gold medalist in 2006 and 2010 respectively. In 2008, he was awarded with another gold medal at the Canada Cup and the same year won it again at the 2008 Summer Paralympics. In 2004 and 2012 Paralympic Games he won two bronze medals following by a silver one at the North American Cup in 2008.

References

1972 births
Living people
Paralympic wheelchair rugby players of the United States
Paralympic gold medalists for the United States
Paralympic bronze medalists for the United States
American wheelchair rugby players
Sportspeople from Spokane, Washington
Medalists at the 2008 Summer Paralympics
Medalists at the 2012 Summer Paralympics
Wheelchair rugby players at the 2008 Summer Paralympics
Wheelchair rugby players at the 2012 Summer Paralympics
Medalists at the 2004 Summer Paralympics
Paralympic medalists in wheelchair rugby
Arizona State University alumni